Jeremy Hardy vs. the Israeli Army is a 2003 feature documentary directed by Leila Sansour and starring comedian Jeremy Hardy. It follows the International Solidarity Movement and their activities in Palestine.

Reviews

References

External links
 
 IMDb entry
 on Jeremy Hardy's website

2003 films
Documentary films about the Israeli–Palestinian conflict
2000s English-language films